Poole & Steel was a major Australian engineering, railway rolling stock manufacturer and shipbuilding company. It had facilities located in Balmain, New South Wales and Osborne, South Australia.

History

The company was set up by Arthur Hugh Poole and James Steel, and the Balmain yard was in operation by 1902. In first decade of the 20th century, it made ships, railway wagons, and notably, gold dredges, production of which boomed during that decade.

The shipyard at Osborne was established in 1919. It was sold to the Government of South Australia in 1937.

It became a public company, Poole and Steel Limited, in late 1944. The Balmain yard was subject to a protracted industrial dispute, in 1946, that resulted in Poole and Steel and all other privately-owned shipyards on the harbour joining forces in a lockout. The company remained profitable into the 1950s, but eventually became a victim of the declining significance of local shipping, reduced work for the navy, industrial disputes and high costs, de facto removal of industry protection, and overseas competition. The Balmain yard appears to have ceased production effectively by 1961.

Products of Balmain

No 5 dumb hopper barge
Oil Fuel Lighter No 3
Oil Fuel Lighter No 1204
Gold dredges, for  Wellington and Jembaicumbene.

Products of Osborne
600 gondola cars for South Australian Railways
500 steel box cars for South Australian Railways
100 steel cars for South Australian Railways

SS Euwarra

Dredges and barges for Harbour Board
Bridge (Murray Bridge)

See also 

 Murrumbidgee River Bridge, Carrathool

References

External links
 Media at Wikimedia Commons under Category: Poole and Steel

Engineering companies of Australia
Defunct locomotive manufacturers of Australia
Defunct rolling stock manufacturers of Australia
Shipbuilding companies of Australia
Shipyards of Australia
Shipyards of New South Wales